This is a list of active and defunct football (soccer) clubs in Bolivia.

Active clubs

Defunct clubs

References
Bolivian First Division at RSSSF
Bolivian Second Division at RSSSF

 
Bolivia
Football clubs
Football clubs